"My Last Date (with You)" is a song written by Boudleaux Bryant, Floyd Cramer, and Skeeter Davis. In 1960, Skeeter Davis recorded and released the song as a single for RCA Victor. The song was an answer song to Floyd Cramer's country pop crossover hit that year titled "Last Date". Skeeter Speaks the first two lines in the Bridge section of the song.

"My Last Date (with You)" was recorded in October 1960 at the RCA Victor Studio in Nashville, Tennessee. The song was released as a single in December 1960, and it peaked at number four on the Billboard Magazine Hot C&W Sides chart later and number 26 on the Billboard Hot 100. The single became Davis' second top-10 hit single in a row on the country chart. It also became her second single to chart on the Hot 100 and her second on to chart among the top 40. In the later months, the song was issued onto Davis' second studio album titled Here's the Answer.

Chart performance

References 

1960 songs
Skeeter Davis songs
Songs written by Felice and Boudleaux Bryant
Songs written by Skeeter Davis
Songs written by Floyd Cramer
Song recordings produced by Chet Atkins
1960 singles
RCA Victor singles